Kirsty's Home Videos is a comedy programme on Sky 1 hosted by Kirsty Gallacher, similar to ITV's You've Been Framed!. It was broadcast between April 2000 and September 2005, running for six series during its time.

Features
The features that were included were home video clips of mainly people falling over, making a fool of themselves and at the end of the programme was a small video with adult men and women being naked and doing daring things like walking through parks and going to a bar.

Some series had seventeen episodes each and were shown on Sky1 every Thursday or Friday. Each series included a Christmas special and sometimes an uncut episode.

All the episodes lasted for 30 minutes.

The final series ended with a two-hour episode which featured outtakes and mishaps.

Transmissions

References

External links

2000 British television series debuts
2005 British television series endings
2000s British comedy television series
Sky UK original programming
Television series by ITV Studios
Video clip television series
Television shows produced by Granada Television
English-language television shows